Ghost Graduation is a 2012 Spanish fantasy-comedy film directed by Javier Ruiz Caldera.

Plot
Modesto is a teacher who sees dead people, which has cost him both much money on psychiatrists and the firing from every school he has worked in. His luck changes when he is hired in Monforte and has to teach five students who have turned a prestigious school into a house of horrors. Modesto must get them to pass their pending subject and leave the school once and for all, but it will be no easy task: all five students died twenty years earlier.

Cast
 Raúl Arévalo as Modesto
 Alexandra Jiménez as Tina
  as Pinfloy
 Anna Castillo as Ángela
 Andrea Duro as Mariví
 Aura Garrido as Elsa
  as Dani
  as Jorge
 Carlos Areces as Otegui
 Silvia Abril as Manuela
  as dead psychiatrist
 Joaquín Reyes as living psychiatrist

References

External links
 
 

2012 films
2012 comedy films
2012 fantasy films
2010s fantasy comedy films
2010s ghost films
2010s high school films
2010s Spanish films
2010s Spanish-language films
Films about educators
Ikiru Films films
MOD Producciones films
Spanish fantasy comedy films
Spanish ghost films
Supernatural comedy films